Cyclistes Frontière refers to volunteer bicycle units of the Belgian Army used to guard its borders, first established in 1934.
They were intended to comprise conscripts stiffened by a cadre of career NCO and officers.

Belgium capitulated on 28 May 1940 and the remaining personnel of the two regiments were dispersed.

The 1st Regiment was not reformed. On 1 April 1960, the Belgian Army reorganised, and the 1st Regiment of Frontier Cyclists may after this point have been reactivated in Liège Province as part of the Belgian military reserve force. It was dissolved in 1995, with the creation of a regiment of territorial frontier cyclists who carried on the traditions of the 2nd Regiment of Frontier Cyclists.

See also
:fr: 1er régiment de cyclistes-frontière 
:fr: 2e régiment de cyclistes-frontière

References

Further reading

External links

Military units and formations established in 1934
1934 establishments in Belgium
Military units and formations of Belgium
Military bicycling